The Public Service Commission of Nepal was established on 15 June 1951. It is the main constitutional body involved in selecting meritorious candidates required by Government of Nepal for Civil Service Vacancy. It is regarded as one of the most credible modes of recruitment by Nepalese. The Constitution of Nepal has regarded the commission as an independent constitutional body.

Organization Setup
The Public Service Commission is overseen by the Office of the Prime Minister and Council of Ministers.

As per Part 23 of the Constitution of Nepal (2072), the PSC consists of an acting Chairman and several further members. These are selected by the President of Nepal on the recommendation of the constitutional council. 50% of the members of this are appointed from the civil servants who have served for 20 or more than so in the field of the government sector.

, the chairman of the PSC was Madhav Prasad Regmi, who was nominated for the post in 2021 .

Reports
The PSC annually submits a report of its work to the President of Nepal. Further it is sent to legislative parliament for discussion. The commission submits an annual report on the work done by it to the president. The president places the report of the commission before the legislative parliament along with a memorandum with regard to the cases where the advice of the commission was not accepted and the reasons for such non-acceptance.

References

Government agencies of Nepal
National civil service commissions
1951 establishments in Nepal